Simboussa is a village on the island of Grande Comore in the Comoros. According to the 1991 census the village had a population of 655.

References

Populated places in Grande Comore